The National Federation of Construction and Wood Workers (FNCB) is a trade union representing workers in the construction and wood working industries in France.

History
The union was founded on 19 May 1934, as the French Federation of Building, Wood, Public Works and Kindred Trades.  It affiliated to the French Confederation of Christian Workers (CFTC).  In 1964, along with the majority of the CFTC, it became a secular union, and affiliated to the new French Democratic Confederation of Labour (CFDT). and in 1966 it adopted its current name.

Membership
By 1995, the union claimed 14,700 members, and by 2017, this had increased to 24,952.

External links

References

Building and construction trade unions
Trade unions established in 1934
Trade unions in France
1934 establishments in France